Nothocalais alpestris is a species of flowering plant in the family Asteraceae known by the common name alpine lake false dandelion. It is native to the Cascade Range, Sierra Nevada and other mountains from northern Washington to central California, where it grows in subalpine forests and meadows, most commonly at  elevation.

Description

The leaves are located around the base of the stem and have toothed, wavy, or smooth edges, and sometimes a thin coat of small hairs. The flower head is borne singly, usually on a leafless stalk. Hairless phyllaries are green, usually with tiny purple dots and nearly equal in length. The outer ones are wider than the inner. The corolla contains many yellow ray florets and no disc florets.

References

External links
 
 
 

alpestris
Flora of California
Flora of Oregon
Flora of Washington (state)
Flora without expected TNC conservation status